A2, A02, A002, A², A.II or A-2 may refer to:

Biology and medicine
 British NVC community A2 (Lemna minor community), a plant community
 A2, the second anal vein in the Comstock-Needham system of insect wing segment naming

Genes and proteins
 A-box 2 of insulin gene
 HLA-A2, a human MHC HLA-A serotype gene
 Ectodysplasin A2 receptor, a protein that in humans is encoded by the EDA2R gene
 Alpha-2 adrenergic receptor
 Annexin A2, a protein
 Apolipoprotein A2, a protein
 Phospholipase A2, an enzyme
 Prokaryotic phospholipase A2, an enzyme
 Hemoglobin A2, a protein
 Proanthocyanidin A2, an A type proanthocyanidin
 Urea transporter A2, a protein
 A2, a variant of blood groups alleles A in the ABO blood group system
 A2, a subfamily of rhodopsin-like receptors

Medicine
 ATC code A02 Drugs for acid related disorders, a subgroup of the Anatomical Therapeutic Chemical Classification System
 Brachydactyly type A2, a disease
 Noradrenergic cell group A2

Computing
 A-2 (programming language), a follow-on to the A-0 System used on UNIVAC I
 A2 (operating system), software to run a computer

Electronics
 DiMAGE A2, a digital camera produced by Minolta
 IBM A2, an IBM processor used in its supercomputers
 Cowon A2, a portable multimedia player from Cowon

Gaming
 A2 Racer, a racing computer game series
 A2 Secret of the Slavers Stockade, a module in the Scourge of the Slave Lords series for Dungeons & Dragons
 Final Fantasy Tactics A2: Grimoire of the Rift

Language
 Biu-Mandara A.2 languages, an Afro-Asiatic family of languages spoken in Nigeria
 A2, a second language level in the IB Group 2 subjects
 A2, a level in the Common European Framework of Reference for Languages

Military
 A-2 jacket, a leather flight jacket
 A2, the military staff designation in the continental staff system for air force headquarters staff concerned with intelligence and security
 A 2, Göta Artillery Regiment designation, a former Swedish Army artillery regiment

Music
 A due, a musical term often abbreviated to a2
 A2, a rock band that performed the song "Chosen One" in the video game Shadow the Hedgehog

Sport
 A2 (classification), an amputee sport classification
 HEBA A2, a Greek basketball league
 A2 volleyball league (Portugal)
 A2 women's volleyball league (Portugal)
 A2, an Italian Baseball League
 A2, an Italian Volleyball League
 A2, a grade in climbing

Television
 A2 (remote television production), a person who manages audio equipment
 A2 Teema, a panel discussion episode of Ajankohtainen kakkonen, a Finnish television series

Transportation

Air
 A-2 Savage or AJ Savage, an aircraft
 Abrial A-2 Vautour, a French sailplane built in 1925
 Antonov A-2, a Soviet glider
 Breda A.2, a 1921 Italian aircraft
 Fokker A.II, a German aircraft
 Nikol A-2, 1939 a prototype of a Polish amphibious flying boat
 Pfalz A.II, a German Idflieg A-class designation aircraft
 Reaction Engines A2, a design study for a hypersonic airliner under development
 Cielos Airlines's IATA code
 A-2, United States Navy alphanumeric code for the North American AJ Savage carrier-launched bomber
 A2, a Botswana aircraft registration code

Rail
 Bavarian A II, an 1847 German steam locomotive model
 LNER Class A2, a class of steam locomotives
 LNER Peppercorn Class A2, a class of steam locomotives 
 LNER Thompson Class A2, 3 classes of Pacific locomotives
 Milwaukee Road class A2, a 1901 4-4-2 type steam locomotive
 SP&S Class A2, an 1887 steam locomotives class
 Victorian Railways A2 class, a 1907 Australian steam locomotive
 PRR A2, a Pennsylvania Railroad locomotive classification
 Prussian A 2, a Prussian railbus model

Road
 List of A2 roads
 Anadol A2, a 1970 Turkish car
 Arrows A2, a 1979 British racing car
 Audi A2, a 1999 automobile
 Merzario A2, see template:F1 cars 1979
 Route A2 (WMATA), a bus route operated by the Washington Metropolitan Area Transit Authority
 Audi Quattro A2, a 1984 rally car evolution of the Audi Quattro

Sea
 HMS A2, a Royal Navy A-class submarine
 Type A2 submarine, a submarine of the Imperial Japanese Navy during World War II
 T2-SE-A2, a type of oil tanker constructed and produced in large quantities in the United States during World War II
 Sea Area A2, as defined under the GMDSS system

Space
 Saturn A-2, a 1959 American rocket
 A-002, the third abort test of the Apollo spacecraft
 Aussat (Optus) A2, a 1985 Australian satellite

Tanks
 M1A2, a version of the American M1 Abrams tank
 M60A2, a version of the American M60 Patton tank

Weapons
 A2 (rocket), a German rocket design (1934)
 AUG A2 Commando, a variant of the Austrian Steyr AUG rifle
 M16A2 rifle, a variant of the M16 rifle of the United States Army
 AR-15A2, a variant of the Colt AR-15 rifle
 M16A2 mine, a variant of the M16 mine of the United States Army
 Polaris A-2, a variant of the Polaris missile of the United States Navy

Other uses
 A2 (theater), a person who manages audio equipment
 DIN4102 A2, a flammability rating for materials ~98% noncombustible
 A2-level, an education qualification in England, Wales and Northern Ireland
 A2 milk, a trademark of the A2 Corporation
 Radio Station A2, a radio station in Lithuania
 A-2 tool steel, an air-hardening SAE grade of tool steel
 A-2 visa, a document given to officials representing a foreign government inside the United States of America
 Agence de l'innovation industrielle (AII), a French governmental agency for technological projects
 Ann Arbor, Michigan, often referred to as A2 or A2
 Bird's Opening's Encyclopaedia of Chess Openings code
 A2, an international standard paper size
 A2 or SAE 304, a grade of stainless steel for fasteners
 A2, a UK Town and Country Planning use class
 A II, a painting by László Moholy-Nagy, painted in 1924
 Sea Area A2, a GMDSS system area
 YoRHa Type A No. 2, or A2, a character from the video game Nier: Automata

See also
 2A (disambiguation)